Lapworth is a village and civil parish in Warwickshire, England, which  had a population of 2,100 according to the 2001 census; this had fallen to 1,828 at the 2011 Census. It lies six miles (10 km) south of Solihull and ten miles (16 km) northwest of Warwick, and incorporates the hamlet of Kingswood. Lapworth boasts a historic church, the Church of St Mary the Virgin, a chapel. Two National Trust sites are nearby: Baddesley Clinton, a medieval moated manor house and garden located in the village of Baddesley Clinton; and Packwood House, a Tudor manor house and yew garden with over 100 trees in Packwood.

The church is a building largely of the 13th and 14th centuries. It includes several unusual features: the steeple is connected by a passage to the north aisle and is built sheer with a projecting stair; the clerestory has square-headed windows; and there is a two-storey annex at the west end. In the church the Portland memorial to Florence Bradshaw was the work of Eric Gill and was installed in 1928. It is a Virgin and Child carved in low relief. The village is a popular area for cuisine, with three pubs "The Boot", "The Navigation" and "The Punch Bowl".

At Kingswood Junction, the Grand Union Canal joins the Stratford-upon-Avon Canal, which has a major flight of locks. Catesby Lane in Lapworth is named after William Catesby (the great grandfather of Robert Catesby of Gunpowder Plot fame), whose family had been settled at Bushwood Hall, in the neighbouring parish of Bushwood, since the 14th century. The manor house was probably at Lapworth Hall, today Ireland's Farm, and in the 17th and 18th centuries the house of the Mander family of Wolverhampton. The furniture designer and maker Hugh Birkett worked from the late 1940s until 1966 in the garage at his parents' home in Lapworth. Examples of his work can be seen at Cheltenham Museum.

Transport 
Originally called Kingswood, the station name was changed to Lapworth to avoid confusion with Kingswood railway station in Surrey. Junction 16 of the M40 motorway has only northbound entry and southbound exit to prevent traffic diverting through Hockley Heath as a shortcut to and from nearby junction 4 of the M42. The village is effectively a commuter village for professionals employed in Birmingham and Coventry, most of whom today drive to their places of work.

Notable persons
Baron Edmiston of Lapworth
Robert Catesby, Gunpowder Plot conspirator
Jonathan Darlington, conductor and Music Director of the Duisburg Philharmonic and Vancouver Opera
Bob Davis a.k.a. Jasper Carrott
Tony Iommi, guitarist and founding member of Black Sabbath, currently resides near the village

References

External links 

Lapworth website
Solihull and Leamington

Villages in Warwickshire
Civil parishes in Warwickshire
Warwick District